The Browns River is a perennial river located on the east coast of Tasmania, Australia.

Course and features
The river rises near Neika and flows generally east towards Kingston, where it empties into Halfmoon Bay within the D'Entrecasteaux Channel that also forms part of the Derwent estuary. The river descends  over its  course.

The river was known to the indigenous people of the area as promenalinah.

The river was named after botanist Robert Brown who collected samples in the area in 1804.  When it was settled in 1808, the area adjacent to the river was also called Browns River.  The locality was renamed "Kingston" in 1851.

See also

References

Rivers of Hobart